Eric Schrader (12 April 1898 – 1976) was a New Zealand cricketer. He played in three first-class matches for Wellington in 1919/20.

See also
 List of Wellington representative cricketers

References

1898 births
1976 deaths
New Zealand cricketers
Wellington cricketers
Cricketers from Wellington City